Quenac Airport  is an airstrip serving Isla Quenac (es), an island in the Los Lagos Region of Chile. The island is in the archipelago between the Gulf of Ancud and the Gulf of Corcovado.

See also

Transport in Chile
List of airports in Chile

References

External links
OpenStreetMap - Quenac
OurAirports - Quenac
FallingRain - Quenac Airport

Airports in Chiloé Archipelago